The clicking shrike-babbler (Pteruthius intermedius) is a species of bird in the family Vireonidae. It is found from Assam, India, eastern Myanmar to southern China, and southern Vietnam.  Its natural habitats are subtropical or tropical moist lowland forests and subtropical or tropical moist montane forests.  It used to be considered a subspecies of the chestnut-fronted shrike-babbler.

References
 Collar, N. J. & Robson, C. 2007. Family Timaliidae (Babblers)  pp. 70 – 291 in; del Hoyo, J., Elliott, A. & Christie, D.A. eds. Handbook of the Birds of the World, Vol. 12. Picathartes to Tits and Chickadees. Lynx Edicions, Barcelona.
Reddy, S. 2008. Systematics and biogeography of the shrike-babblers (Pteruthius): Species limits, molecular phylogenetics, and diversification patterns across southern Asia. Molecular Phylogenetics and Evolution 47: 54–72.
Rheindt, F.E., and J.A. Eaton. 2009. Species limits in Pteruthius (Aves: Corvida) shrike-babblers: a comparison between the Biological and Phylogenetic Species Concepts. Zootaxa number 2301: 29–54.

clicking shrike-babbler
Birds of Northeast India
Birds of Southeast Asia
Birds of Hainan
Birds of Yunnan
clicking shrike-babbler